is a Japanese professional football club based in Kyoto City, Kyoto Prefecture. They play in the Kansai Soccer League Division 2, having been shifting between Division 1 and Division 2 on recent times. The club aims to join the Japan Football League, being only two promotions away from it. Laranja is also one of the few "European-style clubs" in Japan, as it currently have football teams for all age categories. It have branches on Kyoto, Kansai Science City, Toyokawa and Suita.

In 2022, the club finished as 7th in the Kansai Soccer League. With this placement, they will play in the 2nd division Kansai Soccer League for the 2023 season. The club also played in the 2022 Shakaijin Cup, being knocked-out at the Round of 16.

Honours
Kansai Soccer League Division 1
Champions (1): 2004
Kansai Soccer League Division 2
Champions (1): 2019
Kyoto Football League Division 1
Champions (1): 2002
KSL Cup
''Champions (2): 2009

League & cup record

Key

Current squad

Club staff
.

See also 
 Japan Football Association (JFA)

References

External links 
 Official website 

Football clubs in Japan
Association football clubs established in 1987
Sports teams in Kyoto Prefecture
1987 establishments in Japan